Shanxi, a province of the People's Republic of China, is made up of prefecture-level divisions, which are divided into county-level divisions, which are then divided into township-level divisions.

Administrative divisions
These administrative divisions are explained in greater detail at Administrative divisions of the People's Republic of China. The following table lists only the prefecture-level and county-level divisions of Shanxi.

Recent changes in administrative divisions

Population composition

Prefectures

Counties

References

 
Shanxi